The Russia women's national field hockey team represents Russia in women's international field hockey. The team mainly plays in the Women's EuroHockey Championship II, but qualified for the 2019 Women's EuroHockey Nations Championship by finishing second in the 2017 Women's EuroHockey Championship II.

Because of the 2022 Russian invasion of Ukraine, the FIH banned Russia from the Women's FIH Hockey Junior World Cup in April 2022, and banned Russian and Belarusian officials from FIH events. In addition, the European Hockey Federation banned the participation of all Russian athletes and officials from all events sanctioned by the Federation.

Tournament record

World Cup
1994 – 12th place
2002 – 16th place

EuroHockey Championship
1995 – 5th place
1999 – 4th place
2003 – 10th place
2009 – 7th place
2019 – 7th place

EuroHockey Championship II
 2005 – 
 2007 – 
 2011 – 
 2013 – 7th place
 2017 – 
 2021 – 5th place

EuroHockey Championship III
 2015 –

Hockey World League
2012–13 – 22nd place
2014–15 – 27th place
2016–17 – 28th place

See also
Russia men's national field hockey team
Soviet Union women's national field hockey team

References

External links
Official website
FIH profile

European women's national field hockey teams
national team
field hockey